Pluto is an unincorporated community in Holmes County, Mississippi, United States. Pluto is located on the Yazoo River. A post office operated under the name Pluto from 1886 to 1918.

In popular culture
Pluto is the setting for Dispatches from Pluto written by Richard Grant.

References

Unincorporated communities in Holmes County, Mississippi
Unincorporated communities in Mississippi